Azriel Genack is an American physicist, currently a Distinguished Professor at Queens College, City University of New York, and also a published author. His research specializes in microwave and optical propagation.

Genack received his B.A. and Ph.D. from Columbia University. He is a co-founder of Chiral Photonics.

Genack is a leader of the CUNY Alliance for Inclusion,, an organization that defends Israel.

References

Queens College, City University of New York faculty
21st-century American physicists
Living people
Year of birth missing (living people)

Columbia College (New York) alumni
Columbia Graduate School of Arts and Sciences alumni
American company founders